The 2003–04 Liga Gimel season saw 99 clubs competing in 8 regional divisions for promotion to Liga Bet.

Upper Galilee Division
Promoted to Liga Bet:
Hapoel Ironi I'billin (division champions)
Maccabi Majd al-Krum

Other league clubs:
Beitar Bi'ina
Beitar Karmiel
Bnei Kisra
Hapoel Bnei Gush Halav
Hapoel Deir al-Asad
Hapoel Ironi Hatzor
Maccabi Beit Jann
Maccabi Bi'ina
Maccabi Hurfeish
Maccabi Maghar
Maccabi Sha'ab

Western Galilee Division
Promoted to Liga Bet:
Beitar Julis (division champions)
Beitar Kafr Kana

Other league clubs:
Ahi Acre
Beitar Abu Snan
Beitar al-Ittihad Shefa-'Amr
Beitar Ihud Mashhad
Hapoel Halat el-Sharif Tamra
Hapoel Kisra F.C.
Hapoel Nahariya
Hapoel Sha'ab
Hapoel Shefa-'Amr
Maccabi Bnei Yarka
Maccabi Ironi Kabul
Maccabi Kafr Sumei
Maccabi Kafr Yasif

Jezreel Division
Promoted to Liga Bet:
Hapoel Kafr Misr Nein (division champions)

Other league clubs:
Beitar Afula
Beitar Iksal
Beitar el-Amal Nazareth
Beitar F.C. Tabbash
Hapoel al-Ittihad Nazareth
Hapoel Ka'abiyye
Hapoel Kafr Sulam
Hapoel Kfar Kama
Hapoel Kvalim Mesilot
Hapoel Ramot Menashe Megiddo
Hapoel Wadi Salame
Maccabi Beit She'an
Maccabi Ein Mahil

Samaria Division
Promoted to Liga Bet:
Maccabi Or Akiva (division champions)

Other league clubs:
Beitar Umm al-Fahm
Beitar Pardes Hanna
Hapoel Basmat Tab'un
Hapoel Bnei Kababir
Hapoel Bnei Musmus
Hapoel Isfiya
Hapoel Spartak Haifa
Hapoel Umm al-Ghanam Nein
Maccabi Neve Sha'anan
Maccabi Fureidis
Maccabi Ironi Barta'a
Maccabi Ironi Jatt
Maccabi Umm al-Fahm

Sharon Division
Promoted to Liga Bet:
Beitar Kfar Saba (division champions)
Shimshon Bnei Tayibe

Other league clubs:
Beitar Ironi Ariel
Beitar Oranit
Hapoel Aliyah Kfar Saba
Hapoel Beit Eliezer
Hapoel Bik'at HaYarden
Hapoel Ihud Bnei Jaffa
Hapoel Pardesiya
Maccabi Amishav Petah Tikva
Maccabi HaSharon Netanya

Tel Aviv Division
Promoted to Liga Bet:
Hapoel Ramat Israel (division champions)
Beitar Kiryat Ono

Other league clubs:
A.S. Holon
Beitar Ezra
Beitar Pardes Katz
Brit Sport Ma'of
Elitzur Yehud
Elitzur Jaffa Tel Aviv
Hapoel Kiryat Shalom
Maccabi Dynamo Holon
Maccabi Ironi Or Yehuda
Shikun Vatikim Ramat Gan

Central Division
Promoted to Liga Bet:
Hapoel Tirat Shalom (division champions)

Other league clubs:
Hapoel Azrikam
Hapoel Be'er Ya'akov
Hapoel F.C. Ortodoxim Jaffa
Hapoel F.C. Ortodoxim Lod
Hapoel Maxim Lod
Hapoel Neve Golan
Hapoel Ramla
Ironi Beit Dagan
Ironi Beit Shemesh
Ironi Lod
Maccabi Rehovot

South Division
Promoted to Liga Bet:
Maccabi Ironi Netivot (division champions)
Moadon Tzeirei Rahat

Other league clubs:
Beitar Ironi Ma'ale Adumim
Hapoel Bnei Shimon
Hapoel Hura
Hapoel Rahat
Hapoel Tel Sheva
Maccabi Bnei Abu Gosh

External links
Liga Gimel Upper Galilee The Israel Football Association 
Liga Gimel Western Galilee The Israel Football Association 
Liga Gimel Jezreel The Israel Football Association 
Liga Gimel Samaria The Israel Football Association 
Liga Gimel Sharon The Israel Football Association 
Liga Gimel Tel Aviv The Israel Football Association 
Liga Gimel Central The Israel Football Association 
Liga Gimel South The Israel Football Association 

6
Liga Gimel seasons